Lucy McEvoy (born 13 May 2001) is an Australian rules footballer playing for the Sydney Swans in the AFL Women's (AFLW). McEvoy was drafted by Carlton with their first selection and second overall in the 2019 AFL Women's draft. She made her debut against  at Ikon Park in the opening round of the 2020 season.
In March 2023, McEvoy joined Sydney during the priority signing period.

Statistics 
Statistics are correct to the end of the 2020 season.

|- style="background-color:#EAEAEA"
! scope="row" style="text-align:center" | 2020
| 
| 13 || 7 || 3 || 3 || 44 || 47 || 91 || 13 || 29 || 0.4 || 0.4 || 6.3 || 6.7 || 13.0 || 1.9 || 4.1 || 
|- class="sortbottom"
! colspan=3 | Career
! 7
! 3
! 3
! 44
! 47 
! 91 
! 13
! 29 
! 0.4
! 0.4 
! 6.3 
! 6.7 
! 13.0
! 1.9
! 4.1
! 
|}

References

External links 

2001 births
Living people
Australian rules footballers from Victoria (Australia)
Geelong Falcons players (NAB League Girls)
Carlton Football Club (AFLW) players